Jonathan Jack Lyndan Muldoon (born 19 May 1989) is an English professional footballer who plays as a forward for  club Harrogate Town.

Career

Non-League
Muldoon started his career at home-town club Scunthorpe United as a winger, being released in his second year as a youth. After a mid-season at Doncaster Rovers he moved to lower league football, starting with Brigg Town.

Muldoon subsequently represented Sheffield, Glapwell, Alfreton Town, Stocksbridge Park Steels, North Ferriby United and Worksop Town. With the latter he scored 21 league goals during the campaign, attracting interest from Football League clubs.

Rochdale
On 15 May 2014, Muldoon joined Rochdale on a one-year deal, and then quit his job as a plasterer in order to pursue being a professional footballer.
He made his début on 7 October 2014, coming on as a 58th-minute substitute during Rochdale's 1–0 Football League Trophy defeat against Walsall.
He made his Football League debut on 15 November 2014, coming on as a 68th minute substitution for Michael Rose in a 0–1 away loss against Port Vale.
He was released at the end of the season.

Lincoln City
On 28 May 2015, he signed an initial one-year contract at Lincoln City after his release from Rochdale. Made his debut in a 1–1 home draw with Cheltenham and then managed to score his first goal for the Imps in a 1–1 draw with Eastleigh. In January 2016 he signed a new one-year contract extension.

Harrogate Town
On 30 June 2018, Muldoon signed for Harrogate Town from AFC Fylde.

Personal life
He has been diagnosed with Type 1 diabetes.

Career statistics

Honours
Lincoln City
National League: 2016–17

Harrogate Town
National League play-offs: 2020
FA Trophy: 2019–20

References

External links

Club profile at Rochdale A.F.C.

1989 births
Living people
Sportspeople from Scunthorpe
English footballers
Association football forwards
Scunthorpe United F.C. players
Doncaster Rovers F.C. players
Brigg Town F.C. players
Sheffield F.C. players
Glapwell F.C. players
Alfreton Town F.C. players
Stocksbridge Park Steels F.C. players
North Ferriby United A.F.C. players
Worksop Town F.C. players
Rochdale A.F.C. players
FC Halifax Town players
Lincoln City F.C. players
AFC Fylde players
Harrogate Town A.F.C. players
English Football League players
National League (English football) players
People with type 1 diabetes